He Jing (born October 10, 1983 in Jingdezhen, Jiangxi) is a Chinese sprint canoer who competed since the mid-2000s. She won two medals in the K-4 1000 m event at the ICF Canoe Sprint World Championships with a silver in 2007 and a bronze in 2006.

She also finished seventh in the K-4 500 m event at the 2004 Summer Olympics in Athens.

References

Sports-Reference.com profile

1983 births
Living people
People from Jingdezhen
Sportspeople from Jiangxi
Olympic canoeists of China
Canoeists at the 2004 Summer Olympics
Asian Games medalists in canoeing
Canoeists at the 2002 Asian Games
ICF Canoe Sprint World Championships medalists in kayak
Chinese female canoeists
Medalists at the 2002 Asian Games
Asian Games silver medalists for China